The 1993 Hi-Tec British Open Championships was held at the Lambs Squash Club with the later stages being held at the Wembley Conference Centre from 10 to 19 April 1993. Jansher Khan won his second consecutive title defeating Chris Dittmar in the final.

Draw and results

Seeds

Final Qualifying round

Main draw

References

Men's British Open Squash Championships
Men's British Open
Men's British Open Squash Championship
Men's British Open Squash Championship
Squash competitions in London
Men's British Open Squash Championship